Légère et court vêtue, is a French comedy film from 1953, directed by Jean Laviron, written by Jean Guitton, starring Madeleine Lebeau and Louis de Funès. The scenario was based on the work of Jean Guitton – "Un amour fou" (A crazy love).

Cast 
 Madeleine Lebeau : Jacqueline Vermorel, wife of Jacques
 Jean Parédès : Gaétan, the unknown "madman"
 Jacqueline Pierreux : Simone, Pierre's lover
 Jacques-Henri Duval : Pierre Plouvier, an admirer of Jacqueline
 Pierre Destailles : Maître Jacques Vermorel, advocate
 Louis de Funès : Paul Duvernois, the alleged detective
 Nicole Jonesco : Hélène, advocate's maid
 Verlor et Darvil : the singers of the generic song

References

External links 
 
 Au diable la vertu (1953) at the Films de France

1953 films
French comedy films
1950s French-language films
French black-and-white films
Films directed by Jean Laviron
1953 comedy films
1950s French films